The Lys was a 70-gun 3-decker ship of the line of the French Navy, designed by Audibert. She was the first ship of the line to feature suspended lamps instead of candels.

As Ile de France, she was commissioned under Captain Bellisle to  wadged war against the Barbary corsairs.

She was renamed Lys on 24 June 1671. She took part in operations off Tripoli under Captain de La Fayette. In 1672, along with Dauphin, Juste and Reine, she battled corsairs from Algiers at the entrance of Rhône, destroying two of them.

She was part of Abraham Duquesne's squadron in operations off Sicily. She took part in the Battle of Stromboli under Lieutenant-Général Marquis Guillaume d'Alméras, and in the Battle of Augusta, where she led the vanguard of the French fleet. She was in the rear-guard at the Battle of Palermo.

She was eventually broken up in 1689.

Lys
1660s ships